The Upsalquitch River is a tributary of the South bank of the Restigouche River, flowing in Restigouche County, in the northwest of New Brunswick, in Canada.

Geography 

Upsalquitch River originates at the confluence of the Upsalquitch Southeast River and Upsalquitch Northwest River in Restigouche County. This confluence is located north of the Caribou Mountain, in the locality designated "Upsalquitch Forks".

Higher Courses of the river (segment of )

From the confluence of the Upsalquitch Southeast River, Upsalquitch river flows:
  to the northwest in the Addington Parish, collecting the waters of the "One Mile Brook" (coming from the North) to the confluence of the Popelogan River (coming from the North). Note: This junction is located in the upper part of Crooked Rapids;
  westward until McDougalls Brook (coming from the southwest);
  to the northwest across the "Crooked Rapids" until Reids Gulch (coming from the North);
  to the Northwest to South Two Brooks (coming from the southwest);
  to the northwest, to the limit of the Eldon Parish, New Brunswick;

Lower course of the river

  to the Southwest, until Boland Brook (from the southwest);
  to the west, then north to the boundary of the Addington Parish, New Brunswick;
  westward in the Addington Parish, New Brunswick, forming a curve to the north, up to the limit of Eldon Parish, New Brunswick;
  westward to the railway bridge. Note: This track follows the course of Grog Brook (south side) and Meadow Brook (north side);
  to the northwest, to the bridge of the route 17 located in the hamlet of Robinsonville;
  to the northwest, to the confluence of the Upsalquitch River.

Upsalquitch River empties into a river curve on the south bank of the Restigouche River; the latest defines in this sector the border between New Brunswick and Quebec. Upsalquitch Island which is located at the confluence of the Upsalquitch River, faces the Harmony camp.

See also 

 
 Restigouche County
 List of rivers of New Brunswick
 Gulf of Saint Lawrence
 Restigouche River, a stream
 Upsalquitch Southeast River, a stream
 Upsalquitch Northwest River, a stream
 Popelogan River, a stream
 Eldon Parish, New Brunswick
 Addington Parish, New Brunswick

References

External links 
 Website: Restigouche.org - Conseil de Gestion du Bassin Versant de la Rivière Restigouche inc - Restigouche River Watershed Management Council Inc.
 Trekking - Quebec - Report of a canoe expedition on the Upsalquitch 

Upsalquitch
Mi'kmaq in Canada
Canadian Heritage Rivers